The Congregation of the Dominican Sisters of St. Catherine of Siena is a Dominican congregation of religious sisters  under the patronage of St. Catherine of Siena. It was founded by Fr. Juan de Sto. Domingo, O.P., in 1696 for Spanish women only.

History

Francísca de Fuentes was a Spanish young widow in Manila, who devoted her time to prayer and helping the poor and sick. In 1682 she became a Dominican tertiary.

In 1686, Francísca, her sister, María Ana de Fuentes; Antonia de Jesús Esquerra, Maria Ana de la Vega and Sebastiana Salcedo requested that they be allowed to live together in a life of prayer and the practice of the virtues while continuing their social apostolate. Such an arrangement was called a beaterio. Their request was forwarded to the Master General of the Order of Preachers (Dominicans) in Rome, who approved it in January 1688. 

Initially, the new local director of the Third Order, Rev. Juan de Santo Domingo was not enthusiastic, but later came to reconsider and gave his approval. At first, Francísca and her companions lived in the house of Antonia de Esguerra who had by then died. On 26 July 1696 the Beaterio de Sta. Catalina de Sena de las Hermanas de Penitencia de la Tercera Orden was formally inaugurated. Francísca de Fuentes was named prioress and took the name Francisca del Espiritu Santo.

It is known as the Beaterio de Sta. Catalina de Sena in Intramuros, Manila. Unfortunately, discrimination against native Filipinas by the Dominicans continued. It was specified in the beaterio foundation  papers that there would be only fifteen choir sisters of Spanish blood in honor of the fifteen mysteries of the rosary. The Dominican Chapter of April 17, 1633, mandated "that those who enter the convent should all be Spanish women and not in any way mestizos." (Fr. Rolando de la Rosa, OP, Beginnings of the Filipino Dominicans 2014).

Midlife turmoil

In 1746, a tempest roared like a lion battering the beaterio to its foundation, which reverberated to the other beaterios.  Sor Cecilia de la Circuncision, whose secular name was Ita y Salazar, had withdrawn to Santa Catalina to avoid marrying an elderly uncle and professed sixteen years previously.  Now entering middle age, she fell in love with, of all men, Don Francisco Figuerora, the secretary of the governor-general.  The acting governor then happened to be a Dominican friar, Bishop Juan de Arechedrra of Nueva Segovia.  Mother Cecilia turned to the vicar general of the archdiocese, sede vacante, to declare her vows null and void.  The vicar convinced her that this was not the best time to press her case.  The time finally came in 1750 when the new governor, the Marques de Obando arrived and there was also a new archbishop, Fray Pedro de la Santisima Trinidad who was a Franciscan.  The prelate ruled in favor of the Spanish beata on the basis of the royal orders, which repeatedly forbade the beaterio to be a convent.  Over the protests of the Dominicans, Sor Cecilia was able to leave the community borne on a hammock muttering of some illness.  But now she was free to marry Figueroa.  The couple later transferred to Mexico where Cecilia's case was upheld by the archbishop there.  When the report of their infringement of royal laws reached the king of Spain, he decreed, as punishment, the extinction of the beaterio upon the death of the remaining beatas.  This gave the Dominicans ample time to move heaven and earth to have the royal order rescinded.  In the meantime, the governor trained his critical gaze at the other beaterios to ensure that they, too, would comply with the king's edicts or face the threat of extinction-at least during his incumbency.  The royal decree suppressing the beaterio was finally lifted after the war about 1769.

Changes and complications
In 1865, the Dominican priests began recruiting Spanish nuns for the Asian missions.  They were to be housed temporarily in the beaterio while waiting to be transported to their respective assignments. Unfortunately, their efforts to set up religious houses in Spain to train missionary nuns was not successful because of lack of funds and vocations.  Hence, the Spanish nuns remained permanently in the beaterio occupying the principal offices since the Filipina members were mere lay Sisters.  In the last decade of the nineteenth century, however, in order to accord full membership to Filipino applicants from choice families, the beaterio extended the definition of "Spanish mestiza" to the broadest possible meaning of the word.  The community began to accept not only Spanish "half-breeds", but also those families had been classified as "Spanish mestizos" for generations, regardless of the proportion of Spanish blood flowing in their veins. Under this mitigated policy were admitted two Filipinas as choir Sisters who were to figure eminently in the development of the beaterio.  It was only in 1917 that the Filipino lay Sisters gained the status of choir Sisters more than two centuries and a half after the inauguration of the Betaerio de Sta. Catalina.  During his canonical visit to the Philippines in that year, the Dominican master general, Father Ludovicus Theissling, OP, a Dutch, noted the wide discrepancy in status between the Spanish and Filipina Dominicans.  This was two decades after the Spanish colonizers had left and even the Royal Monastery of Santa Clara had opened the door of its cloisters to Filipina applicants.  Led by Mothers Catalina Osmena and Felomena Medalle, the Filipina beatas petitioned the highest official of the Order to grant them full membership to native aspirants who were at least high school graduates regardless of their racial background.  The master general readily gave justice to their request.  Inevitably, the polarization between the Filipina and the Spanish beatas-which paralleled that between the Filipino secular clergy and the Spanish religious Orders during the colonial regime-led to the division of the Beaterio de Sta. Catalina in 1933.  The Spanish Sisters, without consulting the Filipina beatas, formed a new community, the Congregacion de Religiosas Missioneras de Santo Domingo, currently the provincial house is located in Sampaloc, Manila.  When the plans were officially disclosed, the surprised Filipinas, including the criollas and the mestizas, except for a few, opted not to join the Spaniards. They chose to remain in the beaterio and to preserve their institutional identity, this time under diocesan authority. A few of the Sapniards decided to stay in the beaterio with the Filipinas.  The Spanish Dominican priests of the Most holy Rosary allowed the Filipinas to retain their old edifice in the Walled City.  In startling contrast, however, they gave the new Spanish congregation all the other houses of the beaterio in the Philippines, China, Japan and Taiwan, numbering to seventeen.  Thus, the Beaterio de Sta. Catalina was unexpectedly deprived of their mission field.  Invoking the patience of Job, the Filipino nuns refrained from protesting the unequal partition. "The Lord giveth and the Lord taketh away. Blessed be the name of the Lord!".  The Beaterio de Sta. Catlina's eye witness historian, Sor Maria Luisa Henson 1904-1995), expresses the sentiments of her sisters regarding this sad episode in their development:  We, of the Beaterio de Sta. Catlina de Sena, were the first daughters of the province of the Most Holy Rosary, and worked side by side with the Dominican Fathers in the missions.  But during the crucial moment in 1933, we were abandoned and disappointed by the then Provincial Administration under Father (Ricardo) Vaquero (1931–1934).  When two daughters separate from the father, do they not get equal share? Perhaps, the Father Provincial Vaquero was angry because we did not join the Spaniards. (Davis 1990,88)  The only building allotted to the Filipina Dominicans, newly remodeled and reconstructed through the generosity of Mother Catalina Osmena, was bombed to the ground by Japanese invaders.

Prayer:
"God Our Father, You are glorified in Your Saints for in their lives we see the crowning of Your gifts. We commend to you the life and example of Mother Francisca del Espiritu Santo. She responded wonderfully to your grace by a life of holiness. As a woman of the Philippines, she drew herself close to you in her service to the sick, the poor and the young."

"Servant of God, Francisca del Espiritu Santo de Fuentes, intercede for us."

References

External links
 Congregation of the Dominican Sisters of St. Catherine of Siena

Congregations of Dominican Sisters
Catholic religious institutes established in the 19th century
Catholic Church in the Philippines
Notre Dame Educational Association